Southern Thermal Power Station is a coal-based thermal power plant located in Garden Reach, Kolkata in the Indian state of West Bengal. The power plant is operated by the CESC Limited.

Capacity
It has an installed capacity of 135 MW (2x67.5 MW). It became fully operational in 1990.

References

Coal-fired power stations in West Bengal
Power stations in Kolkata
Energy infrastructure completed in 1990
1990 establishments in West Bengal
20th-century architecture in India